Casomorphin is an opioid peptide (protein fragment) derived from the digestion of the milk protein casein.

Health
Digestive enzymes can break casein down into peptides that have some biological activity in cells and in laboratory animals though conclusive causal effects on humans have not been established.

Although research has shown high rates of use of complementary and alternative therapies for children with autism, including gluten and/or casein exclusion diets,  there was a lack of evidence that these diets had any effect.

If opioid peptides breach the intestinal barrier, typically linked to permeability and constrained biosynthesis of dipeptidyl peptidase-4 (DPP4), they can attach to opioid receptors.
Elucidation requires a systemic framework that acknowledges that public-health effects of food-derived opioids are complex with varying genetic susceptibility and confounding factors, together with system-wide interactions and feedbacks.

List of known casomorphins (non-exhaustive)

β-Casomorphins 1–3 

Structure: H-Tyr-Pro-Phe-OH
Chemical formula: C23H27N3O5
Molecular weight: 425.48 g/mol

Bovine β-casomorphins 1–4 

Structure: H-Tyr-Pro-Phe-Pro-OH
Chemical formula: C28H35N4O6
Molecular weight: 522.61 g/mol

Bovine β-casomorphin 1–4, amide 

Structure: H-Tyr-Pro-Phe-Pro-NH2
Chemical formula: C28H35N5O5
Molecular weight: 521.6 g/mol
Also known as morphiceptin

Bovine β-casomorphin 5 

Structure: H-Tyr-Pro-Phe-Pro-Gly-OH
Chemical formula: C30H37N5O7
Molecular weight: 594.66 g/mol

Bovine β-casomorphin 7 

Structure: H-Tyr-Pro-Phe-Pro-Gly-Pro-Ile-OH
Chemical formula: C41H55N7O9
Molecular weight: 789.9 g/mol

Bovine β-casomorphin 8 

Structure: H-Tyr-Pro-Phe-Pro-Gly-Pro-Ile-Pro-OH
Chemical formula: C46H62N8O10
Molecular weight: 887.00 g/mol
(Note: There is also a form of bovine β-casomorphin 8 that has histidine instead of proline in position 8, depending on whether it is derived from A1 or A2 beta-casein.)

References

Dairy products
Peptides